The Scottish Junior Football Association, West Region was one of three regions of the SJFA which organised its own distinct league and cup competitions. The SJFA used to be split into six regions, but in 2002 they took the decision to reform into three (East, North and West) to try to ensure more games between the top clubs and hence increase their revenues. The region covered an area from Girvan in South Ayrshire to Denny in Central Scotland.

History

Foundation
Although the West Region was formed by the amalgamation of the Central and Ayrshire regions in 2002, a West of Scotland Junior FA had existed since the end of the Intermediate dispute in 1931 and administered the West of Scotland Cup since that time. The first phase of rationalisation in 1968 saw the Central Junior Football League (based around greater Glasgow and essentially a continuation of the Glasgow Junior Football League from 1895) merge with the even older Lanarkshire Junior Football League (1891) to create the Central region. The Western Junior League became the Ayrshire region, with Neilston Juniors and Dunoon Athletic transferring to the Central region.

Structure
From 2002 to 2018, the league set-up in the region was a combined top division, officially known as the SJFA West of Scotland Region Super League Premier Division (12 teams), with the West of Scotland Region Super League First Division (14 teams) below. There were two district leagues below that provided the First Division with two clubs each at the end of the season. These corresponded to the former two regions that combined to create the new West region: there was a Central District League (with two divisions) and an Ayrshire District League, with the four teams relegated from the First Division assigned to their historic region. Although Ayrshire only had one division, clubs were also promoted between the two divisions of the Central District League.

In 2017 West Region clubs voted to organise all leagues on a regionwide basis and as a result, the Super League Premier Division was rebranded as the West Region Premiership for the 2018–19 season and featured 16 clubs. Clubs were relegated to a rebranded Championship also made up of 16 teams. The Ayrshire and Central district leagues were scrapped and replaced by League One and Two consisting of 16 and 15 teams respectively.

End of an era
In 2020, as part of a long process of negotiation to form an integrated footballing pyramid structure, all 63 West Region Junior clubs decided to depart and join the newly-founded West of Scotland Football League, a feeder to the Lowland Football League.

Member clubs
Towards the end of the 2019–20 campaign, the coronavirus pandemic interrupted the season and caused the West Region leagues to be curtailed, with champions later declared on a 'points per game' basis by the West Region management committee. At that time there were 63 member clubs in the setup.

SJFA West Region Premiership

 Notes

SJFA West Region Championship

SJFA West Region League One

SJFA West Region League Two

Cup competitions
The West Region organised several cup competitions for member clubs:
 West of Scotland Cup: This was a knockout tournament for all West Region clubs. The competition originated as the Scottish Intermediate Cup in 1927–28 and was renamed The West of Scotland Cup following the ending of the Intermediate dispute in 1931.
Sectional League Cup: Introduced for the 2018–19 season as a combination of the Central and Ayrshire sectional league cups, clubs competed in eight regional groups with the group winners progressing to the knockout stages.
Evening Times Champions Cup: This was a knockout tournament played at the end of the season between the winners of the four or five West Region league competitions during the preceding season. The champions of the Ayrshire District League and Central District Second Division played in a preliminary round tie with the winners of that game joining the other three clubs at the semi-final stage. The Evening Times trophy was first presented in 1896–97 to the winners of the Glasgow Junior League and has been awarded to the winners of various competitions over the years. Between 2003 and 2012, the competition involved all ten league and cup winners in the West Region and was known as the Evening Times Cup Winners Cup.

Pre-2018 competitions

Central League Cup. This was a knockout tournament for former Central Region clubs in the West Region. It was first played for in 1921–22 when known as the Glasgow Junior League Cup.
Ayrshire Cup. This was a knockout tournament for former Ayrshire Region clubs in the West Region. The tournament originated in 1889–90 as the Ayrshire Junior Challenge Cup and was won for the first three seasons by Glenbuck Cherrypickers.
Central Sectional League Cup. This tournament was for former Central Region clubs and was the opening competition of the season. Clubs initially competed in eight groups (sections) with the group winners advancing to a knockout competition. Based geographically, the groups comprised the same clubs each season. Matches in the group stages were played under league rules so a player was not cup-tied by turning out for a particular club.
Ayrshire Sectional League Cup. This tournament was for former Ayrshire Region clubs. Clubs initially competed in four groups (sections) with group winners and runners up advancing to the knockout stages, otherwise the format was the same as that of the Central Sectional League Cup

Holders
2018–19 winners unless stated.

West of Scotland Cup: - Beith Juniors
Sectional League Cup: Auchinleck Talbot (2019–20)
Evening Times Champions Cup: (2017–18)
Central League Cup: Pollok (2017–18)
Ayrshire Cup: Kilwinning Rangers (2017–18)
Central Sectional League Cup: Clydebank (2017–18)
Ayrshire Sectional League Cup: Auchinleck Talbot (2017–18)
Clydesdale Cup: Lesmahagow

Roll of Honour

References

External links
 SJFA, West Region

 
2002 establishments in Scotland
Sports organizations established in 2002
Sports organizations disestablished in 2020
2020 disestablishments in Scotland